Scarborough Fair may refer to:
 Scarborough Fair (fair), a no longer extant late Middle Ages annual trading fair in Scarborough, Yorkshire;
 "Scarborough Fair" (ballad), a traditional English ballad;
 Scarborough Fair Collection, a museum of fairground mechanical organs and showman's engines in Scarborough, Yorkshire;
 Scarborough Faire, an annual reenactment renaissance fair also known as Scarborough Renaissance Festival held in mid-Spring in Waxahachie, Texas;
 Scarboro Fair, a defunct annual fair held in Scarborough, Ontario.

See also 
 Scarborough Festival, an end of season series of cricket matches at Scarborough, Yorkshire;
 Vanity Fair, a disambiguation page for a similar term that is used in many different contexts.
 Scarborough Fair, a set of four firearms used by the titular character in Bayonetta (video game).